James Brooks (1704–1763) was an Anglican clergyman.

Brooks was born in Oxford and educated at Christ Church there.  He was Archdeacon of Stafford from 1732 until his death.

References 

Alumni of Christ Church, Oxford
18th-century English Anglican priests
Archdeacons of Stafford
People from Oxford
1704 births
1763 deaths